Sincik District is a district of Adıyaman Province of Turkey. Its seat is the town Sincik. Its area is 495 km2, and its population is 16,341 (2021).

The district was established in 1990.

Composition
There are two municipalities in Sincik District:
 İnlice
 Sincik

There are 24 villages in Sincik District:

 Aksu
 Alancık
 Arıkonak
 Balkaya
 Çamdere
 Çat
 Çatbahçe
 Dilektepe()
 Eskiköy 
 Geçitli
 Hasanlı
 Hüseyinli
 Karaköse
 Narlı
 Pınarbaşı
 Sakız
 Serince 
 Söğütlübahçe
 Subaşı
 Şahinbeyler
 Şahkolu
 Taşkale
 Uğurlu
 Yarpuzlu

Demography

The town and its villages are populated by Kurds from the Reşwan tribe.

References

Districts of Adıyaman Province